J1 Live Concert is a live video album by Taiwanese singer Jolin Tsai. It was released on September 23, 2005, by Sony BMG. It chronicled the J1 World Tour at Chungshan Soccer Stadium in Taipei, Taiwan on November 20, 2004. It also contains one new song, "Paradise". In Taiwan, it topped the weekly video album sales chart of G-Music for 12 consecutive weeks, and it topped the video album sales chart of Five Music.

Background and release 
On August 7, 2004, Tsai embarked on her first concert tour J1 World Tour at Hongkou Football Stadium in Shanghai, China. On September 7, 2005, Sony BMG announced that it would release a live video album for the tour on September 16, 2005. On September 13, 2005, the label announced that it would be postponed until September 23, 2005. On September 23, 2005, she released the live video album J1 Live Concert, which chronicled the J1 World Tour held at Chungshan Soccer Stadium in Taipei, Taiwan on November 20, 2004 and one new song named "Paradise". The album was the first live video album using technologies of HDTV and Dolby Digital 5.1 in the history of Chinese singers. "Paradise" is the Chinese version of Jem's "They", and it was a promotional song of Motorola.

On October 1, 2005, Tsai held an album signing session in Taipei, Taiwan. On October 19, 2005, the label released the music video of "Paradise", which was co-directed by Marlboro Lai and Bill Chia. It peaked at number one on the weekly video album sales charts of G-Music and Five Music, it topped the video album sales charts of G-Music and Five Music for 12 consecutive weeks and five consecutive weeks, respectively, and it topped the 2005 year-end video album sales chart of Five Music.

Critical reception 
Tencent Entertainment's Shuwa commented: "It's rare to see live concert albums produced in Taiwanese market over the years, this album chronicled Jolin Tsai's J1 Concert, but unfortunately it was not fully included the whole concert, only 16 songs were included. Other works were cut into pieces by the label and included in the greatest hits album released later. However, as there were only two concerts in Taiwan at that time, such live albums are more able to satisfy those fans who have no chance to watch the live performance, so even if it is incomplete, it does not affect the sales. On October 27, 2005, the second edition of the live album was released, and the corresponding DVD has topped on Taiwan's video album sales charts for many weeks."

Track listing

Release history

References 

2005 live albums
2005 video albums
Jolin Tsai live albums
Jolin Tsai video albums
Sony Music Taiwan live albums
Sony Music Taiwan video albums